The Ashland Oregon National Guard Armory is an armory building located in Ashland, Oregon, in the United States. It was designed by William C. Knighton, Oregon's first State Architect, and was built from 1912 to 1913. The armory displays California Mission and Gothic Revival architectural styles and remains one of four pre-World War I armories in western Oregon. It is listed on the National Register of Historic Places.

See also
National Register of Historic Places listings in Jackson County, Oregon

References

1913 establishments in Oregon
Armories in Oregon
Buildings and structures completed in 1913
Buildings and structures in Ashland, Oregon
Gothic Revival architecture in Oregon
Mission Revival architecture in Oregon
National Register of Historic Places in Jackson County, Oregon